The Bushbuckridge Local Municipality is a Local Municipality in Mpumalanga, South Africa. The council consists of seventy-six members elected by mixed-member proportional representation. Thirty-eight councillors are elected by first-past-the-post voting in thirty-eight wards, while the remaining thirty-eight are chosen from party lists so that the total number of party representatives is proportional to the number of votes received. In the election of 1 November 2021 the African National Congress (ANC) won a majority of fifty-three seats.

Results 
The following table shows the composition of the council after past elections.

March 2006 election

The following table shows the results of the 2006 election.

May 2011 election

The following table shows the results of the 2011 election.

August 2016 election

The following table shows the results of the 2016 election.

By-elections from August 2016 to November 2021
In December 2020, the Better Residents Association (formerly the Bushbuckridge Residents Association) lost 3 of its 14 seats in the municipality after it expelled three of its ward councillors, and did not contest the resulting by-elections.

November 2021 election

The following table shows the results of the 2021 election.

By-elections from November 2021
The following by-elections were held to fill vacant ward seats in the period from November 2021. In ward 13, the ANC candidate died, and in the by-election held on 31 August 2022, the ANC candidate retained the seat by 21 votes over the EFF.

References

Bushbuckridge